Snowy Point is a gently sloping point marking the north side of the western portal of Browning Pass, 1.5 nautical miles (2.8 km) southeast of Cape Sastrugi in Deep Freeze Range, Victoria Land. First explored and given this descriptive name by the Northern Party of the British Antarctic Expedition, 1910–13.

Headlands of Victoria Land
Scott Coast